Soldat (soldier) is the lowest rank in the Romanian Land Forces. It is the equivalent of jandarm in the Romanian Gendarmerie.

In day-to-day usage, the term soldat denotes every man or woman enrolled in the Romanian Armed Forces, irrespective of their actual rank or branch in which they activate.

Military ranks of Romania
Romanian Land Forces